Manjul Krishna Thakur (b 1952/53) is an Indian politician and the present Minister of State for Refugee Relief & Rehabilitation (Independent Charge) and the Minister of State for Micro & Small Scale Enterprises and Textiles in the Government of West Bengal. He lives in Thakurnagar.

He became MLA in 2011, elected from the Gaighata constituency in the 2011 West Bengal state assembly election. The term ended in 2016.

Kapil Krishna Thakur, the former MP from Bangaon, was his elder brother. He is the second son of Matua Barama Binapani Devi. His son, Shantanu Thakur, was elected to Lok Sabha on BJP ticket in 2019. Subrata Thakur, who is also Manjul Krishna's son, had contested bye-poll from Bangaon (Lok Sabha constituency) on BJP's ticket in 2015 but he came third. Manjul Krishna Thakur had himself joined BJP for 4–5 months in 2014 but was accepted back in Trinamool fold upon his request.

References 

West Bengal politicians
Bharatiya Janata Party politicians from West Bengal
Living people
State cabinet ministers of West Bengal
Year of birth missing (living people)
Matua people